Mexiweckelia is a genus of amphipods in the family Hadziidae. There are at least three described species in Mexiweckelia.

Species
These three species belong to the genus Mexiweckelia:
 Mexiweckelia colei Holsinger & W. L. Minckley, 1971
 Mexiweckelia hardeni Holsinger, 1992
 Mexiweckelia mitchelli Holsinger, 1973

References

Amphipoda
Taxa named by Wendell L. Minckley
Articles created by Qbugbot